Solidago decurrens is an Asian species of flowering plants in the family Asteraceae. It is widespread across China, India, Korea, Japan, Indochina, Nepal, Philippines, and other nearby countries.

Solidago decurrens is a perennial herb up to 100 cm (40 inches) tall. One plant produces many small yellow flower heads in a large branching array at the top of the plant.

References

External links

decurrens
Flora of China
Flora of Korea
Flora of Japan
Flora of tropical Asia
Plants described in 1790